Mauro Germán Camoranesi Serra  (born 4 October 1976) is an Italian football manager and former player who played as a right midfielder or right winger.

Camoranesi began his career in Argentina in 1995, where he played for Aldosivi and Banfield, also having spells in Mexico with Santos Laguna and Cruz Azul, and in Uruguay with Wanderers. In 2000, he moved to Italy, joining Verona, where his performances earned him a transfer to defending Serie A champions Juventus in 2002. Camoranesi won the league title and the Supercoppa Italiana in his first season with the club, also reaching the Champions League final; he spent most of his career with the Turin side, also winning a second Supercoppa Italiana during his eight seasons with the Bianconeri. In 2010, he joined German side VfB Stuttgart for a season, before returning to Argentina to play for Lanús, and subsequently Racing Club, where he retired in 2014. Following his retirement, Camoranesi began his managerial career later that year, and has since coached Mexican club Coras de Tepic and Argentine side Tigre.

Born and raised in Argentina, Camoranesi represented Italy at international level, making his debut in 2003. With Italy, he took part at UEFA Euro 2004, UEFA Euro 2008, and the 2009 FIFA Confederations Cup; he also took part in the 2010 FIFA World Cup, and was a member of Italy's winning squad at the 2006 World Cup.

Club career

Early career
Camoranesi had always been a big fan of the Argentinian club River Plate growing up, but as a youngster, he played in the squad of Club Atlético Aldosivi. Aldosivi is situated in Mar del Plata just 100 miles away from Camoranesi's birthplace of Tandil. However, he moved to Mexico to begin his professional playing career at Santos Laguna during the 1995–96 season and scored one goal in 13 games for the team; Santos Laguna fans nicknamed him "El Cholo".

Banfield
More travels came for the young Argentine the following year, as he moved to Uruguayan club Montevideo Wanderers briefly, before returning to his homeland to play for Banfield in 1997, solidifying himself as an impressive attacking right midfielder, while playing 38 games with 16 goals.

Cruz Azul

The following season, Camoranesi returned to Mexico as a member of club Cruz Azul, where he played from 1998 to 2000, making over 60 appearances and scoring 20 goals.

Verona
He caught the attention of Italian Serie A side Verona by scoring 21 goals in 79 games with Cruz Azul, an impressive achievement for a midfielder. He moved to Italy in 2000, signing with Verona where he played for two years, helping the club avoid relegation in his first season with 4 goals in 22 appearances.

Juventus

In 2002, Camoranesi was signed by Juventus on a co-ownership deal; initially Juventus agreed a price of €1 in cash plus player deal (which Max Vieri was sold for €517,000 (or 1 billion lire) plus €2.324 million cash (or 4.5 billion lire cash)) On 26 June 2003, he was signed outright by the Bianconeri on a permanent basis for an additional fee of €5 million; this was the same day Juventus signed Marco Di Vaio in similar deal.

Camoranesi soon established himself into the starting line-up on the right wing, following an injury to Gianluca Zambrotta, and in his first season with the club, he won the 2002–03 Serie A title, and the 2002 Supercoppa Italiana, also reaching the 2003 UEFA Champions League Final; the following season, he also added the 2003 Supercoppa Italiana to his trophy cabinet. Camoranesi also won two more Serie A titles with Juventus in the 2004–05 and 2005–06 seasons, but Juventus were stripped of both of those titles as result of their involvement in the 2006 Italian football scandal, and relegated to Serie B.

Despite his agent Sergio Fortunato linking the player to clubs such as Lyon, Valencia, and Liverpool over the summer of 2006, following Juventus's relegation, Camoranesi made an announcement himself in September, pledging loyalty to Juventus "In January, I will not ask to be sold; I'm happy to stay here.", he stated.

Camoranesi put on some notable performances and contributed to a number of notable goals for Juventus during the 2006–07 Serie B season, scoring 4 in total, as Juventus won the title and earned promotion back to the Italian top flight. Against Lecce in April 2007, he performed an impressive piece of skill similar to a Cruyff turn, turning the ball through a defender's legs on the wing, before retrieving it to help set up Juventus's first goal of the match. Later in the match, he scored his side's third; Camoranesi took the ball past three Lecce defenders, before hitting the ball from the edge of the box, with his left foot into the top corner. Just days before he had scored a header in the 2–0 victory against close title contenders Napoli.

Despite initially rumours of his departure, on 10 July 2007, he extended his contract with the club until 2010. For the 2007–08 Serie A season, his shirt number was changed from 16 to 8. Despite suffering several injuries during the 2007–08 season, he was a very important and influential player in Juventus's first Serie A season since their return to the top flight season. He scored 5 goals in 22 appearances, and also won the Guerin d'Oro award, as the player with the highest average rating, for his performances throughout the season.

Camoranesi changed back to number 16 jersey ahead of the 2008–09 Serie A season, and also extended his contract for another year. Camoranesi had an impressive pre-season, but was often sidelined by injuries at the start of the season. After struggling in the first few games in the start of the 2009–10 Serie A season, Camoranesi came back strongly and proved to be one of Juventus's most important players. He managed to get his name on the scoresheet too, scoring the solitary goal against Maccabi Haifa in the Champions League, as well as a brace in a 5–2 win over Atalanta.

Stuttgart
On 31 August 2010, Camoranesi signed a one-year contract with Stuttgart as a free agent. His contract with Juventus was mutually terminated on the same day. On 26 January 2011, his contract with Stuttgart was mutually terminated, with Camoranesi admitting that he "just didn't fit in the club sporting wise, although he liked the team, the people and the city." He expressed a desire to continue his career in Argentina.

Lanús
On 2 February 2011, Camoranesi signed a two-year contract with Lanús with the option to coach youth players if he decides to retire. In October 2011, Camoranesi made headlines for kicking an opponent in the head. In a match against Racing Club, Camoranesi fouled Patricio Toranzo and was shown a red card by the referee. Instead of walking off, Camoranesi ran back and kicked Toranzo in the head while Toranzo was still lying on the ground. Toranzo later commented that Camoranesi is "not much of a man, just a coward" and suggested Camoranesi would need to see a psychiatrist for his violent behaviour. Camoranesi faced a long ban from football for this incident.

Racing Club
On 20 July 2012, Camoranesi signed in for Argentine side Racing Club from Avellaneda. On 13 June 2013, he announced that he would retire from football at the end of the season in June, although rumours have circulated he could be close to joining Leicester to link up with Argentine midfielder Esteban Cambiasso. On 16 March 2014, Mauro was subbed on in the 68th minute for teammate Rodrigo De Paul, his side lost 0–2 away to Newell's Old Boys, a club which saw former Juventus teammate David Trezeguet score the second goal of the game in the 83rd minute. This turned out to be Camoranesi's last game in his career.

International career
Camoranesi was eligible for Italian citizenship through a great-grandfather, Luigi, who in 1873 emigrated from Potenza Picena, in Italy's Marche region, to Argentina. His dual citizenship made him eligible to play for either Argentina or Italy, but the Azzurri showed interest in him first and, on 12 February 2003, he made his international debut in a friendly match against Portugal, which Italy won 1–0, under former coach Giovanni Trapattoni. Camoranesi played for Italy at UEFA Euro 2004 and was also part of Marcello Lippi's Italy team which won the 2006 FIFA World Cup. He has been capped 55 times by Italy and has scored four goals, the first of which came in Italy's 2006 World Cup qualifier away to Belarus on 7 September 2005, which the Italians won 4–1.

During the 2006 World Cup Finals in Germany, he admitted the reason for not singing Italy's national anthem before their matches was because he did not know the words, although he could be seen singing (at least a part of) the anthem during the World Cup celebrations in Circus Maximus on 10 July 2006. Camoranesi was not the first Juventus player born in Argentina to play for Italy; Omar Sivori played for the Azzurri, as well as Luis Monti and Raimundo Orsi who also won the World Cup while playing for Juventus.

At the end of 2006 FIFA World Cup Final match in Germany, in which Italy defeated France 5–3 in a penalty shoot-out, Camoranesi had teammate Massimo Oddo chop off a large chunk of his long hair as the rest of the squad danced around them in a circle. Camoranesi then went up to the camera and dedicated the triumph by saying in Spanish: "Para los pibes del barrio" (For the guys from the neighbourhood).

Camoranesi commented in an interview in regards to the World Cup victory: "I feel Argentine but I have worthily defended the colours of Italy. I think that nobody can say otherwise"

He was successively called up to Italy's squads for UEFA Euro 2008 and 2009 FIFA Confederations Cup. He also took part in the 2010 FIFA World Cup, his last experience with the Italian national team.

Managerial career
On 15 December 2017, Camoranesi received his coaching licence.

On 3 January 2020, Camoranesi was appointed manager of Slovenian PrvaLiga side Tabor Sežana, signing a one-and-a-half-year contract.

On 3 September 2020, Camoranesi was appointed manager of Slovenian PrvaLiga side Maribor, signing a three-year contract. He was sacked on 23 February 2021.

On 5 July 2022, Camoranesi was appointed assistant manager of Olympique de Marseille after Igor Tudor became the manager of the club. However, he left the team only a week later when Tudor named Hari Vukas as his assistant.

Managerial statistics

Style of play
Camoranesi was a dynamic, hard-working, and skilful midfielder, who usually deployed on the right wing, or on occasion on the left flank, or as a central or attacking midfielder behind the strikers. He was a quick, energetic, and technically gifted player, with excellent ball control, who excelled at dribbling and beating players in one on one situations and getting up the flank. He was also gifted with good vision, creativity, crossing and passing ability with his right foot, which allowed him to create chances for his teammates. In addition to these characteristics, he also had an accurate and powerful shot, in particular from outside the penalty area, and was known for both his offensive and defensive contribution, which enabled him to start attacks after winning back the ball. A tenacious winger, throughout his career, he was however criticised for his aggression and lack of discipline at times, which caused him to pick up unnecessary bookings.

Career statistics

Club

International

Scores and results list Italy's goal tally first, score column indicates score after each Camoranesi goal.

Honours

Club
Cruz Azul
 Mexican Primera División runner-up: Invierno 1999

Juventus
 Serie A: 2002–03
 Supercoppa Italiana: 2002, 2003; runner-up 2005
 Serie B: 2006–07
 Coppa Italia runner-up: 2003–04
 UEFA Champions League runner-up: 2002–03

Racing Club
 Copa Argentina runner-up: 2011–12

International
Italy
 FIFA World Cup: 2006

Individual
Guerin d'Oro: 2007–08

Orders
  CONI: Golden Collar of Sports Merit: 2006

  4th Class / Officer: Ufficiale Ordine al Merito della Repubblica Italiana: 2006

Notes

References

External links
 
 
 Statistics at Guardian StatsCentre
 Argentine Primera statistics at Fútbol XXI 
 
 FIGC Profile 

1976 births
Living people
People from Tandil
Sportspeople from Buenos Aires Province
Citizens of Italy through descent
Argentine emigrants to Italy
Italian people of Argentine descent
Italian footballers
Italy international footballers
VfB Stuttgart players
Juventus F.C. players
Hellas Verona F.C. players
UEFA Euro 2004 players
2006 FIFA World Cup players
FIFA World Cup-winning players
UEFA Euro 2008 players
2009 FIFA Confederations Cup players
2010 FIFA World Cup players
Association football midfielders
Association football wingers
Argentine footballers
Argentine people of Italian descent
Aldosivi footballers
Argentine expatriate footballers
Expatriate footballers in Mexico
Liga MX players
Santos Laguna footballers
Montevideo Wanderers F.C. players
Argentine Primera División players
Primera Nacional players
Uruguayan Primera División players
Serie A players
Serie B players
Bundesliga players
Club Atlético Banfield footballers
Cruz Azul footballers
Expatriate footballers in Italy
Expatriate footballers in Germany
Expatriate footballers in Uruguay
Argentine expatriate sportspeople in Italy
Argentine expatriate sportspeople in Mexico
Argentine expatriate sportspeople in Slovenia
Argentine expatriate sportspeople in France
Italian expatriate sportspeople in Mexico
Italian expatriate sportspeople in Slovenia
Italian expatriate sportspeople in France
Italian expatriate sportspeople in Uruguay
Racing Club de Avellaneda footballers
Club Atlético Lanús footballers
Italian football managers
Club Atlético Tigre managers
NK Maribor managers
Olympique de Marseille non-playing staff
Expatriate football managers in Mexico
Expatriate football managers in Slovenia
Argentine people of Marchesan descent
Officers of the Order of Merit of the Italian Republic
Italian expatriate football managers
Argentine expatriate football managers